The 2012–13 UCI America Tour was the ninth season for the UCI America Tour. The season began on 7 October 2012 with the Tobago Cycling Classic and ended on 7 September 2013 with the Bucks County Classic.

The points leader, based on the cumulative results of previous races, wears the UCI America Tour cycling jersey. Rory Sutherland from Australia was the defending champion of the 2011–12 UCI America Tour. Janier Acevedo from Colombia was crowned as the 2012–13 UCI America Tour champion.

Throughout the season, points are awarded to the top finishers of stages within stage races and the final general classification standings of each of the stages races and one-day events. The quality and complexity of a race also determines how many points are awarded to the top finishers, the higher the UCI rating of a race, the more points are awarded.

The UCI ratings from highest to lowest are as follows:
 Multi-day events: 2.HC, 2.1 and 2.2
 One-day events: 1.HC, 1.1 and 1.2

Events

2012

2013

Final standings
There is a competition for the rider, team and country with the most points gained from winning or achieving a high place in the above races.

Individual classification

Team classification

Nation classification

Nation under-23 classification

External links

UCI America Tour
2013 in road cycling
2012 in road cycling
UCI
UCI
UCI
UCI